Philip David Zelikow (born September 21, 1954) is an American diplomat, academic and author. He has worked as the executive director of the 9/11 Commission, director of the Miller Center of Public Affairs at the University of Virginia, and counselor of the United States Department of State. He is the White Burkett Miller Professor of History at the University of Virginia and was American Academy in Berlin Axel Springer Fellow, in the fall of 2009.

Education 
Zelikow received a BA in history and political science from the University of Redlands, a JD from the University of Houston Law Center (where he was an editor of the law review), and a MALD and PhD in international relations from the Fletcher School of Law and Diplomacy at Tufts University.

Career

Academic and federal government positions 
After practicing law in the early 1980s, Zelikow turned toward the field of national security. He was adjunct professor of national security affairs at the Naval Postgraduate School in Monterey, California in 1984–1985.

He joined the United States Department of State through the standard examination process for the foreign service as a career civil servant. As a foreign service officer, he served overseas at the U.S. mission to the conventional arms control talks in Vienna, at the State Department's 24-hour crisis center, and on the secretariat staff for Secretary of State George P. Shultz, during the second Reagan administration (1985–1989).

In 1989, in the George H. W. Bush administration, Zelikow was detailed to the National Security Council, where he was involved as a senior White House staffer in the diplomacy surrounding the German reunification and the diplomatic settlements accompanying the end of the Cold War in Europe. During the first Gulf War, he aided President Bush, National Security Advisor Brent Scowcroft, and Secretary of State James Baker in diplomatic affairs related to the coalition. He co-authored, with Condoleezza Rice, the book Germany Unified and Europe Transformed: A Study in Statecraft (1995), an academic study of the politics of reunification.

In 1991, Zelikow left the NSC to go to Harvard University. From 1991 to 1998, he was Associate Professor of Public Policy and co-director of Harvard's Intelligence and Policy Program, at Harvard Kennedy School.

In 1998, Zelikow moved to the University of Virginia, where until February 2005 he directed the nation's largest center on the American presidency. He served as director of the Miller Center of Public Affairs and, as White Burkett Miller Professor of History, held an endowed chair. The Center launched a project to transcribe and annotate the previously secret tapes made during the Kennedy, Johnson and Nixon presidencies. In a presidential oral history project headed by James Sterling Young, it systematically gathers additional information on the presidencies of Reagan, George H. W. Bush, and Clinton.

In November 1998, Zelikow co-authored, "Catastrophic Terrorism: Tackling the New Danger" for Foreign Affairs magazine. He wrote, "Like Pearl Harbor, the event would divide our future into a before and after. The United States might respond with draconian measures scaling back civil liberties, allowing wider surveillance of citizens, detention of suspects, and the use of deadly force. More violence could follow either future terrorist attacks or U.S. counterattacks. Belatedly, Americans would judge their leaders negligent for not addressing terrorism more urgently."

In September 2002, a year after 9/11, Zelikow authored, "The National Security Strategy of The United States of America". Outlining the U.S. pre-emptive war doctrine that 6 months later in contravention of U.N. Resolution 1441 would be used against Iraq in an illegal war lasting nearly nine years.

In January 2003, Zelikow was appointed executive director of "The 9/11 Commission Report," replacing Henry Kissinger.

Following an appointment at the Department of State from 2005 to 2007 during the Bush administration, Zelikow returned to academics at the University of Virginia. In 2011, he was appointed Associate Dean of the Graduate School of Arts & Sciences. He has been instrumental in restructuring the College of Arts & Sciences. Also in 2011, Zelikow was appointed by President Barack Obama to the President's Intelligence Advisory Board. Since 2019 he has been Distinguished Visiting Fellow at the Hoover Institution, Stanford University.

Commissions and committees

Bush transition team
In late 2000 and early 2001, Zelikow served on President Bush's transition team. After George W. Bush took office, Zelikow was named to a position on the President's Foreign Intelligence Advisory Board [PFIAB], and worked on other task forces and commissions as well. He directed the bipartisan National Commission on Federal Election Reform, created after the 2000 election and chaired by former presidents Jimmy Carter and Gerald Ford, along with Lloyd Cutler and Bob Michel. This Commission's recommendations led directly to congressional consideration and enactment into law of the Help America Vote Act of 2002.

Markle Task Force on Security
In 2002, Phil Zelikow became the executive director of the Markle Task Force on National Security in the Information Age. The Task Force comprises a diverse and bipartisan group of experienced policymakers, senior executives from the information technology industry, public interest advocates, and experts in privacy, intelligence, and national security. The Markle Task Force seeks to inform the policy judgments and investments of the federal, state and local governments in the collection and use of information as it relates to national security. The Task Force's reports and recommendations have been codified through two laws (IRPTA 2004 and the Implementing 9/11 Commission Report Act 2007) and several presidential directives.

Executive director of the 9/11 Commission
Zelikow was appointed executive director of the 9/11 Commission (National Commission on Terrorist Attacks Upon the United States), whose work included examination of the conduct of presidents Clinton and George W. Bush and their administrations prior to and on September 11, 2001. Zelikow's prior involvement with the administration of George W. Bush led to opposition from the 9/11 Family Steering Committee, citing the obvious conflict of interest of having previously worked on the Bush transition team. The Commission's Republican chair and Democratic vice-chair strongly defended Zelikow, both at the time and later. In response to the concerns, Zelikow had agreed to recuse himself from any investigation matters pertaining to the National Security Council's transition from the Clinton to Bush administrations, which Zelikow had helped manage.

After being informed of the Department of Defense's Able Danger project by U.S. Army Lieutenant Colonel Anthony Shaffer, he failed to have the 9/11 Commission investigate, despite the promise that the Commission would investigate all 9/11 related topics. Able Danger was not included in the Commission's final report. In 2005 and 2006 a member of the House Armed Services Committee, Rep. Curt Weldon, publicized Shaffer's allegations in public statements and hearings. A September 2006 report of the Department of Defense Inspector General found that these allegations were baseless. A further report by the Senate Select Committee on Intelligence came to the same conclusion in December 2006.

Some staff members of the 9/11 Commission distrusted Zelikow, considering him to be a "White House mole" in view of his being a close confidant of National Security Adviser Condoleezza Rice and his having worked in several high level capacities in the George W. Bush administration.

Rice national security strategy project
In Rise of the Vulcans (2004), James Mann reports that when Richard Haass, a senior aide to Secretary of State Colin Powell and the director of policy planning at the State Department, drafted an overview of America’s national security strategy following the September 11, 2001 attacks, Dr. Rice, the national security advisor, "ordered that the document be completely rewritten. She thought the Bush administration needed something bolder, something that would represent a more dramatic break with the ideas of the past. Rice turned the writing over to her old colleague, University of Virginia Professor Philip Zelikow." One criticism of this document, issued on September 17, 2002, is that it is supposed to have been a significant document in an alleged Bush administration doctrine of preemptive war. However, in the drafting of this document Zelikow had opposed the proposed language using preemption in the context of how to deal with weapons of mass destruction.

Rework America
In 2014–15, while on leave from the University of Virginia and working for the Markle Foundation, Zelikow helped lead a Foundation-sponsored group of prominent Americans called "Rework America." The group developed arguments and ideas on how to use the digital revolution to enlarge economic opportunity for all Americans. The group published its ideas in "America's Moment: Creating Opportunity in the Connected Age."

George W. Bush administration
Zelikow's role in the second Iraq war is discussed at some length in Bob Woodward's State of Denial, which presents him as an internal critic of the way the war was being conducted in 2005 and 2006, and as an originator of the alternative approach termed "clear, hold, and build." He is also named by sources such as Jack Goldsmith's The Terror Presidency as an internal critic of the treatment of terrorist captives, and there was wide attention given to an address he made on this subject after leaving office in April 2007.

Based on speeches and internal memos, some political analysts believe that Zelikow disagreed with aspects of the Bush administration's Middle Eastern policy.

As Counselor to Secretary of State Rice, Zelikow opposed the Bush administration Torture Memos. In 2006, Zelikow wrote a memorandum warning that the abuse of prisoners through so-called "enhanced interrogation" could constitute war crimes.<ref>McGreal, Chris, [https://www.theguardian.com/world/2012/apr/05/bush-official-torture-condoleezza-rice Former senior Bush official on torture: 'I think what they did was wrong'] The Guardian, April 5, 2012.</ref> Bush administration officials ignored his recommendations, and tried to collect all copies of the memo and destroy them. Jane Mayer, author of the Dark Side, quotes Zelikow as predicting that "America's descent into torture will in time be viewed like the Japanese internments," in that "(f)ear and anxiety were exploited by zealots and fools."

Expertise
Zelikow's area of academic expertise is the history and practice of public policy. In addition to the work on German unification, he has been significantly involved in contemporary scholarship on the Cuban Missile Crisis, including the relation between this crisis and the East-West confrontation over Berlin.

While at Harvard, he worked with Ernest R. May and Richard Neustadt on the use, and misuse, of history in policymaking. They observed, as Zelikow noted in his own words, that "contemporary" history is "defined functionally by those critical people and events that go into forming the public's presumptions about its immediate past. The idea of 'public presumption'," he explained, "is akin to William McNeill's notion of 'public myth' but without the negative implication sometimes invoked by the word 'myth.' Such presumptions are beliefs (1) thought to be true (although not necessarily known to be true with certainty), and (2) shared in common within the relevant political community."

Zelikow and May also authored and sponsored scholarship on the relationship between intelligence analysis and policy decisions. Zelikow later helped found a research project to prepare and publish annotated transcripts of presidential recordings made secretly during the Kennedy, Johnson, and Nixon administrations (see WhiteHouseTapes.org) and another project to strengthen oral history work on more recent administrations, with both these projects based at the University of Virginia's Miller Center of Public Affairs.

In writing about the importance of beliefs about history, Zelikow has called attention to what he has called "'searing' or 'molding' events [that] take on 'transcendent' importance and, therefore, retain their power even as the experiencing generation passes from the scene. In the United States, beliefs about the formation of the nation and the Constitution remain powerful today, as do beliefs about slavery and the Civil War. World War II, Vietnam, and the civil rights struggle are more recent examples." He has noted that "a history’s narrative power is typically linked to how readers relate to the actions of individuals in the history; if readers cannot make a connection to their own lives, then a history may fail to engage them at all."

In 2020, Zelikow, along with over 130 other former Republican national security officials, signed a statement that asserted that President Trump was unfit to serve another term, and "To that end, we are firmly convinced that it is in the best interest of our nation that Vice President Joe Biden be elected as the next President of the United States, and we will vote for him."

Terrorism
Zelikow has also written about terrorism and national security, including a set of Harvard case studies on "Policing Northern Ireland." In the November–December 1998 issue of Foreign Affairs, he co-authored an article Catastrophic Terrorism, with Ashton B. Carter, and John M. Deutch, in which they speculated that if the 1993 bombing of the World Trade Center had succeeded, "the resulting horror and chaos would have exceeded our ability to describe it. Such an act of catastrophic terrorism would be a watershed event in American history. It could involve loss of life and property unprecedented in peacetime and undermine America’s fundamental sense of security, as did the Soviet atomic bomb test in 1949. Like Pearl Harbor, the event would divide our past and future into a before and after. The United States might respond with draconian measures scaling back civil liberties, allowing wider surveillance of citizens, detention of suspects and use of deadly force. More violence could follow, either future terrorist attacks or U.S. counterattacks. Belatedly, Americans would judge their leaders negligent for not addressing terrorism more urgently."

Peace in World War I

From the outbreak of World War I in 1914 until January 1917, US President Woodrow Wilson's primary goal was using American neutrality to broker a peace conference that would end the war. In the first two years neither side was interested in negotiations. However, that changed in late 1916 when, Zelikow argues, both sides were ready for peace negotiations, if Wilson would be the broker. However, Wilson waited too long, failed to realize the importance of his financial power over Britain, and put mistaken reliance on Colonel House and Secretary of State Robert Lansing, who undermined his proposals by encouraging Britain to stall. Zelikow emphasizes that German Chancellor Bethmann Hollweg was seriously interested in peace, but he had to fend off the demands of Paul von Hindenburg and Erich Ludendorff who were taking dictatorial control of Germany. Zelikow argues that when Wilson finally did make his peace proposal in January 1917, it was too little and too late, and instead of peace the war escalated. Hindenburg and Ludendorff had convinced the Kaiser that victory was at hand by using unrestricted submarine warfare, and moving troops in from the Russian front to smash the French and British front lines.

Works written or co-written
Zelikow has co-written many books. He wrote a book with Ernest May on The Kennedy Tapes, and another with Joseph Nye and David C. King on Why People Don’t Trust Government. Others include:
 Philip D. Zelikow with Condoleezza Rice, Germany Unified and Europe Transformed: A Study in Statecraft Harvard University Press, 1995, hardcover, 520 pages, ; trade paperback, 1997, 520 pages, 
 Philip D. Zelikow with Graham T. Allison, Essence of Decision: Explaining the Cuban Missile Crisis 2nd edition Longman, 1999. 440 pages, 
 Philip D. Zelikow with Ernest R. May, The Kennedy Tapes: Inside the White House During the Cuban Missile Crisis Harvard University Press, 1997, 728 pages, 
 Philip D. Zelikow, American Military Strategy: Memos to a President (Aspen Policy Series) W.W. Norton & Company, 2001, 206 pages, 
 Philip D. Zelikow with Condoleezza Rice, To Build a Better World: Choices to End the Cold War and Create a Global Commonwealth" Twelve, 2019. 528 pages, 
 Philip D. Zelikow, The Road Less Traveled: The Secret Battle to End the Great War, 1916-1917 (PublicAffairs, 2021).

Affiliations
Zelikow is a member of the Global Development Program Advisory Panel, Gates Foundation.

References

Further reading

 Van Meter, Robert H. "Secretary of State Marshall, General Clay, and the Moscow Council of Foreign Ministers Meeting of 1947: A Response to Philip Zelikow." Diplomacy and Statecraft 16.1 (2005): 139-167.

External links

Snowshoe Films Zelikow (Documentary by Snowshoe Films)
 Scholarly articles
 CV

1954 births
Harvard Kennedy School faculty
Living people
Miller Center Affiliates
Naval Postgraduate School faculty
People associated with the September 11 attacks
The Fletcher School at Tufts University alumni
United States National Security Council staffers
University of Houston Law Center alumni
University of Virginia people